Anthony Oluwafemi Olaseni Joshua  (born 15 October 1989) is an English professional boxer. He is a two-time former unified world heavyweight champion, having held the WBA (Super), IBF, WBO, and IBO titles twice between 2016 and 2021. At regional level, he held the British and Commonwealth heavyweight titles from 2015 to 2016.

As an amateur, Joshua represented England at the 2011 World Championships in the super-heavyweight division, winning a silver medal. He also represented Great Britain at the 2012 Olympics, winning gold. In 2014, a year after turning professional, he was named Prospect of the Year by The Ring magazine. In 2017, his victorious fight against Wladimir Klitschko was named Fight of the Year by The Ring and the Boxing Writers Association of America. Joshua is the second English boxer, after James DeGale, to win both a gold medal at the Olympics and a world title by a major professional sanctioning body, as well as the first English heavyweight to do so.

As of October 2022, Joshua is ranked as the world's second-best active heavyweight by BoxRec, third by The Ring, and fourth by Transnational Boxing Rankings Board and ESPN, as well as the sixth-best active boxer, pound for pound, by BoxRec. He has been ranked by BoxRec as among the world's top 10 heavyweights since 2014, and was ranked at No. 1 at the conclusion of 2016 and 2017. Joshua's knockout-to-win percentage stands at 91.67%, with an overall knockout percentage of 63.64% in world heavyweight title fights.

Early life
Anthony Oluwafemi Olaseni Joshua was born on 15 October 1989 in Watford, Hertfordshire, the son of Yeta and Robert Joshua. His mother is Nigerian, while his father is of Nigerian and Irish ancestry. Joshua's Nigerian background can be specifically traced back to the Yoruba people, amongst whom he is of aristocratic rank. His cousin, Ben Ileyemi, is also a professional boxer. The pair made their professional debuts together in 2013. Joshua spent some of his early years in Nigeria as a boarding school student at Mayflower School in Ikenne. Following his parents' divorce when he was 12, he returned to the UK halfway through Year Seven to join Kings Langley Secondary School. Growing up on the Meriden Estate in Garston, Hertfordshire, he was called "Femi" by his friends and former teachers, due to his middle name, Oluwafemi. He excelled at football and athletics and broke his school's Year Nine 100 m record with a time of 11.6 seconds.

Amateur career
A late starter in the sport, Joshua began boxing in 2007, aged 18, when his cousin suggested he take it up. His club, Finchley ABC in Barnet, North London, is also home to professional heavyweight Derek Chisora. Joshua won the 2009 and 2010 Haringey Box Cup. Joshua also won the senior ABA Championships in 2010, in only his 18th bout, and later turned down £50,000 to turn professional. "Turning down that £50,000 was easy. I didn't take up the sport for money, I want to win medals." He also went on to win the same tournament the following year. In 2010 his domestic success earned him a place on the GB Boxing team and later the same year he became British amateur champion at the GB Championships after defeating Amin Isa. At the 2011 European Championships in June he beat the German Eric Brechlin 23:16 and the Irishman Cathal McMonagle 22:10 but was stopped by the Romanian southpaw Mihai Nistor after receiving several standing counts. In October 2011 he was named Amateur Boxer of the Year by the Boxing Writers Club of Great Britain. Joshua had an amateur record of 40–3.

During the 2011 World Championships in Baku, Azerbaijan, Joshua marked his sudden arrival on the world scene when he beat Italian reigning world and Olympic champion Roberto Cammarelle, and went on to stop Erik Pfeifer of Germany in the semis before losing by a single point to local boxer, Magomedrasul Majidov winning a silver medal. En route to the final, Joshua secured his place at the 2012 Olympic Games in the super-heavyweight division as a relative newcomer to the elite level of the sport.

Joshua went into the 2012 London Olympics as a novice on the international scene, despite being a world silver medalist. He received a tough draw in the last 16 of the super-heavyweight event in Cuban Erislandy Savón, ranked No. 4 in the world by AIBA and nephew of the three time Olympic champion Félix Savón. The home boxer battled through three tough rounds in his opening contest before being given the result 17:16. This decision caused some controversy with most observers believing Savon had clearly won the bout
whilst a few others taking the view that he had won on merit. In his next bout he fought 2008 Beijing Olympics silver medalist Zhang Zhilei, dropping his taller opponent in the middle round; Joshua won by 15:11 guaranteeing at least a bronze medal. In the semi-final Joshua met Kazakh boxer Ivan Dychko, and despite Joshua's height disadvantage he won by 13:11 to gain a place in the Olympic final. Joshua met 32-year-old reigning Olympic champion and former two-time world champion, Roberto Cammarelle of Italy in the closing bout. After conceding the first two rounds (6:5 and 13:10) to Cammarelle, an adversary he had already beaten the previous year, Joshua grew into the fight and fought back to level the scores after the third round (18:18). Joshua was announced winner via count-back and the new Olympic champion. The final decision was criticised by some boxing experts, being defined as a "home decision".

He was appointed Member of the Order of the British Empire (MBE) in the 2013 New Year Honours for services to boxing.

English National Championships results 
2010
Defeated Dominic Akinlade (England) PTS
Defeated Luke Herdman (England) RSC-2
Defeated N/A WO.
Defeated Chris Duff (England) WO.
Defeated Simon Hadden (England) WO.
Defeated Dominic Winrow (England) RSC-1

2011
Defeated N/A WO.
Defeated N/A WO.
Defeated Fayz Aboadi Abbas (England) 24–15.

Great Britain Championships results 
2010
Defeated Amin Isa (England) 6-3

International Amateur Boxing Tournament results 
2010
Defeated Otto Wallin (Sweden) PTS

England vs Ireland results 
2010
Defeated Chris Turner (Ireland) 6-3

AIBA World Boxing Championships results 
2011
Defeated Tariq Abdul-Haqq (Trinidad and Tobago) RSCI-3
Defeated Juan Isidro Hiracheta (Mexico) AB-1
Defeated Mohamed Arjaoui Morocco) 16-7
Defeated Roberto Cammarelle (Italy) 15-13
Defeated Erik Pfeiffer (Germany) RSCI-1
Lost to Magomedrasul Medzhidov (Azerbaijan) 22-21

Algirdas Socikas Tournament results 
2012
Defeated Sean Turner (Ireland) 9-5
Defeated Johan Linde (Australia) KO-1
Defeated Aidas Petruskevicius (Lithuania) W0.

European Amateur Boxing Championships results 
2011
Defeated Eric Brechlin (Germany) 23-16
Defeated Cathal McMonagle (Ireland) 22-10
Lost to Mihai Nistor (Romania) RSCH-3

Bocskai Memorial results 
2012
Defeated Sergey Kuzmin (Russia) 9-7
Defeated Sardor Abdullayev (Uzbekistan) RSC-3

Olympic Games results 
2012
Defeated Erislandy Savón (Cuba) 17-16
Defeated Zhang Zhilei (China) 15:11
Defeated Ivan Dychko (Kazakhstan) 13-11
Defeated Roberto Cammarelle (Italy) +18-18

Professional career

Early career
On 11 July 2013 it was confirmed that Joshua had turned professional under the Matchroom Sport promotional banner. Joshua made his professional debut on 5 October 2013 at the O2 Arena in London in the Main-Event of a card featuring Scott Quigg's successful WBA super-bantamweight title defence against Yoandris Salinas, beating Italian Emanuele Leo by a technical knockout (TKO) in the first round. Joshua's second fight was against English heavyweight Paul Butlin at the Motorpoint Arena in Sheffield on 26 October 2013. The bout was stopped in the second round when the referee decided Butlin was taking too much punishment and declared Joshua the winner by TKO. Joshua's third fight was on the Prizefighter Series card against Croatian Hrvoje Kišiček on 14 November 2013. Joshua got a TKO victory in the second round, achieving his third knockout (KO) victory in a row.

In February 2014, Joshua scored a second-round TKO victory over Dorian Darch to take his record to 4–0. The following month, on the undercard of Ricky Burns against Terence Crawford, Joshua defeated Hector Alfredo Avila with a first-round KO, in Glasgow, Scotland. In May that year Joshua knocked out Matt Legg in one round on the undercard of Carl Froch vs. George Groves II at Wembley Stadium. In Joshua's seventh fight, on 12 July 2014 at the Echo Arena, Liverpool, he defeated Englishman Matt Skelton via second-round stoppage. In Joshua's eighth fight, on 13 September 2014, against German heavyweight Konstantin Airich, Joshua took his undefeated record to 8–0 with a third-round stoppage victory at the Manchester Arena.

Joshua was in the Main-Event of a Matchroom Sport card for the second time in his career, in his ninth professional appearance for the vacant WBC International heavyweight title against Dennis Bakhtov, the former champion looking to win the title for a second time, on 11 October 2014 at The O2 Arena in London. Joshua won the fight by KO in the second round, taking his record to 9–0 and winning the WBC International heavyweight title aged just 24.

In his tenth bout, on 22 November 2014, Joshua defeated Michael Sprott within the first round to extend his record to ten wins, all by stoppage. With the fight only lasting 1 minute and 26 seconds, it gave Joshua a total ring time in the professional ranks of just 36 minutes and 36 seconds.

He was supposed to face American boxer Kevin Johnson on 31 January 2015 at The O2 Arena in London, but the bout was cancelled after Joshua sustained a back injury. On 4 April 2015, Joshua beat Jason Gavern with a third-round KO in his return to the ring in Newcastle. On 9 May 2015, in his twelfth bout, Joshua defeated Raphael Zumbano Love in a second-round KO in Birmingham. On 30 May 2015, Joshua defeated former world title challenger Kevin Johnson (29–6–1, 14 KOs), inflicting the first stoppage in Johnson's career. After Johnson was saved by the bell in the first round the fight was stopped by the referee shortly after the beginning of the second round. Prior to the fight, Johnson had taken the likes of Vitali Klitschko, Tyson Fury and Derek Chisora the twelve-round distance. A day after the fight, Johnson announced his retirement, although he made a comeback in March 2017.

British and Commonwealth champion

Joshua vs. Cornish 

On 16 July 2015, it was announced that Joshua would fight undefeated Scottish boxer Gary Cornish (21–0, 12 KOs) for the vacant Commonwealth heavyweight title at The O2 Arena, London, on 12 September. At the time of the fight, Cornish was the IBO Intercontinental champion. Joshua won the vacant title by stopping Cornish at just 90 seconds in the first round. Cornish was knocked down twice before the fight was officially stopped. In the post-fight, Joshua said, "Gary had a solid jab so I had to make sure I didn't take any of those shots. He was throwing a large jab and I tried to slip it. I managed to land the right hand and it was a perfect connection and he went down."

Joshua vs. Whyte

Immediately after Joshua stopped Cornish, Joshua's promoter, Eddie Hearn, confirmed Dillian Whyte would next put his undefeated record on the line against Joshua. Joshua met Whyte in a grudge match for the vacant British heavyweight title on 12 December 2015, whilst also defending his Commonwealth heavyweight title for the first time. The fight took place on Sky Box Office. The two had previously fought within the amateur rankings in 2009 where Whyte had won. After surviving the first scare of his career in the second round, Joshua won the fight after initially shaking Whyte with a right hook to the temple and eventually finishing with a devastating uppercut for the KO in the seventh round. It is said that Joshua earned £3 million for this fight alone, as a result of signing a new five-year deal with Matchroom which sees him take a share of the PPV revenue earned.

IBF heavyweight champion

Joshua vs. Martin

In February 2016, it was announced that Joshua would face IBF heavyweight champion Charles Martin (23–0–1, 21 KOs) on 9 April 2016 at the O2 Arena. Martin was making the first defence of the belt that he won after defeating Vyacheslav Glazkov for the vacant title in January 2016. Joshua set the pace in the first round and kept the southpaw Martin at bay before sending him to the canvas with a straight right hand in the second round. Martin got to his feet, only to be knocked down for a second time by a similar punch just moments later. This time Martin failed to beat the count after taking too long to get up, and the referee waved the fight off, with Joshua winning his first world title.

Martin was heavily criticized for his performance, and apparent lack of ambition to win the fight. Observers accused him of quitting early, feeling that he could have got up quicker and fought on. Martin later placed the blame on the pre-fight distractions, claiming that he was 'mentally not there'. At just 85 days, Martin's reign as IBF heavyweight champion was the second shortest in professional boxing history, with only Tony Tucker's 1987 reign being shorter.

Joshua vs. Breazeale

Promoter Eddie Hearn announced a three-man shortlist from the IBF's top 15 ranked boxers for Joshua's first defence of his title. This included former WBC heavyweight champion Bermane Stiverne (25–1–2, 21 KOs) and Eric Molina (25–3, 19 KOs), both of whom were recently beaten by American WBC champion Deontay Wilder, alongside unbeaten upcoming fighter Dominic Breazeale (17–0, 15 KOs). On 25 April, it was announced that Joshua's next fight will be against Dominic Breazeale on 25 June 2016 at the O2 Arena in London. Breazeale was ranked 13th by the IBF, below British pair Derek Chisora and David Haye. Breazeale became only the second boxer, after Dillian Whyte, to take Joshua past three rounds. After a dominant performance, Joshua successfully defended his IBF heavyweight title with a seventh-round knockout win. Breazeale was dropped heavily by a huge left hand. After the fight, Eddie Hearn said Joshua could next fight IBF mandatory challenger, Joseph Parker, around November. The fight averaged 289,000 viewers on Showtime in the afternoon. The card averaged 227,000 viewers.

A week after the fight was announced against Breazeale, Joshua announced a new multi-fight deal with US broadcaster Showtime. The fight screened live in the States by Showtime after they signed up as Joshua's exclusive US partner.

Joshua vs. Molina

It was announced in August that Joshua would be making a second defence of his IBF title at the Manchester Arena in Manchester, on 26 November. This would mark the first time since September 2014 that Joshua would be fighting in the city. Possible names put forward for the fight were top IBF contenders Kubrat Pulev and Joseph Parker. Former unified heavyweight champion Wladimir Klitschko became the front-runner after his scheduled rematch with Tyson Fury was cancelled a second time.

A deal could not be finalized for Joshua vs. Klitschko, due to the WBA delaying a decision to sanction the fight and Klitschko injuring himself, which put the fight off completely. Klitschko said he would be looking to fight Joshua in the first quarter of 2017. Bryant Jennings and David Price were the names being pushed forward to fight Joshua next, however it was announced Joshua would be fighting at the Manchester Arena, defending his world title against former world title challenger Eric Molina (25–3, 19 KOs), who was coming off a stoppage victory against Tomasz Adamek, although being behind on the official scorecards. The fight was televised in the US live on Showtime. After two one sided rounds, which saw Molina hardly throw a punch, Joshua knocked Molina out in the third round. He was first dropped after a right hand to the jaw. Molina beat the count but was met with a flurry of punches, forcing referee Steve Gray to end the fight. According to Nielsen Media Research, the fight peaked at 390,000 on Showtime, with an average viewing of 368,000 viewers. On 22 May 2018, UK Anti-Doping issued Molina with a two-year ban from fighting in the UK, backdated from 28 October 2017 until 28 October 2019. Molina tested positive for dexamethasone, a corticosteroid, after his loss to Joshua. There was some controversy as Molina had fought twice after in 2017.

First reign as unified heavyweight champion

Joshua vs. Klitschko

On 2 November 2016, the WBA agreed to sanction a unification bout between Joshua and Klitschko for the vacant WBA (Super) title, previously held by Tyson Fury. The WBA agreement was, if Joshua retained his belt against Eric Molina, the fight would take place on 29 April 2017, at Wembley Stadium in London.

After Joshua knocked out Molina in the third round, the Joshua vs. Klitschko fight was officially announced by Hearn in the ring. WBA president Gilberto J. Mendoza confirmed that the winner will have to face mandatory challenger Luis Ortiz next, with deadlines due to be set after the unification fight. A day later the IBF announced the winner must fight their mandatory challenger Kubrat Pulev. Because of this clashing with the WBA enforcing their mandatory, it was believed that either Joshua or Klitschko would have to vacate a title. In January 2017, Eddie Hearn announced that over 80,000 tickets had been sold, a new box office record, overtaking Carl Froch vs. George Groves II. He put a request in for 5,000 more tickets to be made available. It was reported that Joshua would earn in the region of £15 million for the fight. At the weigh-in, Klitschko, 41 at the time of the fight, weighed in at 240 and a quarter pounds, the lightest he had weighed since 2009. Joshua, 27, came in heavier at 250 pounds.

In front of a post-war record crowd of 90,000 in attendance, Joshua won by TKO in a high-drama war that saw both men giving their all. They fought a close and cautious first four rounds. In the fifth, Joshua came and threw a flurry of punches, forcing Klitschko to the canvas. An angry Klitschko rose up and took control for the remainder of the round, landing clean punches and scoring his own knockdown in round six. The next few rounds were again cautious, both men wary of each other, until a reinvigorated Joshua attacked Klitschko in round eleven, sending him to the canvas. Klitschko again rose but Joshua knocked him down for a second time in the round. When Klitschko rose back to his feet, Joshua threw a barrage of unanswered punches while Klitschko was against the ropes, prompting the referee to stop the fight.

At the time of stoppage, Joshua was ahead on two of the judges' scorecards at 96–93 and 95–93, while the third judge had Klitschko ahead with 95–93. CompuBox stats showed that Joshua landed 107 of his 355 punches thrown (30%), and Klitschko landed 94 of 256 (37%). Joshua called out Fury in the post fight interview, "Tyson Fury, where you at, baby? Come on -- that's what they want to see. I just want to fight everyone. I'm really enjoying this right now." In the press conference after the fight, Joshua said he would have no issues with having another fight with Klitschko, "I don't mind fighting him again, if he wants the rematch. Big respect to Wladimir for challenging the young lions of the division. It's up to him, I don't mind. As long as Rob thinks it's good I'm good to go." Eddie Hearn said Joshua's next fight would likely take place at the end of the year, possibly at the Principality Stadium in Cardiff.

The fight averaged 659,000 viewers on Showtime in the United States. It was shown live and the fight began around 5 pm. ET and 2 pm. PT. Nielsen Media Research revealed the fight peaked at 687,000 viewers which was during rounds five and six. This was an increase from Joshua's previous Showtime numbers that aired live during the late afternoon. The delayed tape-replay on HBO was watched by an average 738,000 viewers and peaked at 890,000. In a press release, German TV channel RTL announced the fight was watched by an average 10.43 million viewers. The whole card averaged 9.59 million viewers. This was higher than the 8.91 million that tuned in to watch Klitschko vs. Fury in 2015.

On 7 June 2017, the IBF granted Joshua an exemption for him to rematch Klitschko instead of fighting mandatory challenger Kubrat Pulev. At this point, it was not said that the rematch would take place. Klitschko said he needed time to review his situation before agreeing to a rematch. It was only weeks after the fight, when Eddie Hearn filed the paperwork to the IBF to request the exemption to the mandatory defence. IBF explained that the rematch must take place no later than 2 December 2017, and the winner must fight Pulev next with no exemptions. On 2 August, Joshua revealed he would need to start a three-month training camp on 22 August, if he was to fight on 11 November, therefore hoping a fight with Klitschko would be finalised by then. However, on 3 August 2017, soon after the IBF granted an exemption, Klitschko announced on his website and social media channels that he was retiring from the sport of boxing. Thus, ending the possibility of a Joshua v Klitschko rematch.

Joshua vs. Takam

On 3 August 2017, Klitschko announced on his website and social media channels that he was retiring from boxing. As a result, on 4 August, upon learning that Klitschko had retired, the IBF immediately ordered Joshua and 36-year-old Kubrat Pulev (25–1, 13 KOs) to fight next, with a deal needing to be reached by 3 September 2017. The WBA then ordered Joshua to make his mandatory defence against their top ranked fighter Luis Ortiz, giving them 30 days to reach a deal. According to Hearn, the plan was to fight Pulev next, followed by Ortiz and then a potential unification fight against Deontay Wilder. On 22 August, details between the camps of Joshua and Pulev were being discussed and close to being finalised for the date of 28 October 2017, with Las Vegas as the potential host.

On 28 August, it was announced that Joshua and Pulev would fight at the Principality Stadium in Cardiff. Promoter Eddie Hearn made the official announcement on 5 September, "I'm delighted that we will be in Cardiff at the magnificent Principality Stadium for the next step of the AJ journey. Nearly 80,000 will gather on Oct. 28 to create another unforgettable night of boxing. Anthony will meet his mandatory challenger, [IBF] No. 1-ranked Kubrat Pulev, and the card will be stacked with world championship action, domestic title fights and the very best young stars in the game. Get ready for the next episode from the biggest star in world boxing." The official press conference took place on 11 September, and the following day, a reported 70,000 tickets had been sold, making it the fastest selling event. It also set the record of largest boxing attendance to be expected indoors. The previous record was Muhammad Ali vs. Leon Spinks rematch which gathered 63,000 fans at the New Orleans Superdome in 1978. Joshua's three-fight deal with Showtime had expired, giving Eddie Hearn the chance to talk to other providers. Showtime had the right of first option and a matching right, if any providers bid higher. When HBO bid $1.6 million for the rights to show the fight, Showtime matched the bid, meaning the fight would be shown live in the afternoon on Showtime.

On 16 October, rumours circulated that Pulev had suffered an injury, which could see the fight being in jeopardy. The same reports suggested the injury was 10 days old, but Pulev's camp had kept it quiet. The injury was later revealed to be true and 36-year-old Carlos Takam (35–3–1, 27 KOs), who was ranked number 3 by the IBF, stepped in to replace Pulev on 12 days notice. Eddie Hearn said in a statement that he received a phone call from Pulev's promoter , advising him of a shoulder injury he had sustained during sparring. Hearn revealed when the Joshua vs. Pulev fight was made, he contacted Takam's camp, knowing they would be next in line and told them to begin a training camp and stay on standby. IBF stated that Joshua fighting Takam would satisfy his mandatory defence. Despite Hearn claiming Joshua would weigh around 235–240 pounds, he officially weighed a career-heavy 254 pounds, while Takam came in a 235 pounds.

On fight night, in front of nearly 80,000 fans in attendance, Joshua retained his world titles with what many believed was a premature stoppage in round ten. The official time of stoppage was 1 minute, 34 seconds. Many fans ringside booed the referee stoppage, which saw Takam go out on his feet. After a cagey first round, the second round saw Takam accidentally headbutt Joshua's nose, likely breaking it, causing Joshua's eyes to water. In round four, Joshua opened up a cut above Takam's right eye. After the referee checked the eye, Joshua knocked Takam down with a left hook to the head. He beat the count and lasted the remainder of the round. Another cut appeared above Takam's left eye in round seven. Referee Phil Edwards asked the ringside doctor to take a look at Takam a few times during the fight. In rounds eight and nine, Joshua started to back off, which saw Takam come forward and land some good shots to Joshua's head. In round ten, Joshua landed a clean right uppercut followed by a barrage of punches. Referee Phil Edwards, seeing this, stepped in between, halting the fight. A doctor confirmed that Joshua's nose was not broken, only bruised and swollen.

It was revealed at the time of the stoppage, judges Pawel Kardyni and Michael Alexander had Joshua ahead 89–81, whilst judge Ron McNair had the fight 90–80 perfect for Joshua. In the post-fight interview, Joshua was asked about the stoppage, to which he replied, "It was a good fight until the ref stopped it, I have the utmost respect for Takam. I have no interest for what's going on with the officials. My job is the opponent. I don't have control over the ref's decision." Takam believed the fight was stopped too early, stating he would appreciate a rematch. Hearn and Joshua spoke about potential fights in 2018, which included fights with Joseph Parker and Deontay Wilder, where a win against both would see Joshua the undisputed champion and an all-English clash against Tyson Fury. CompuBox stats showed that Joshua landed 152 of 454 punches thrown (34%) and Takam was less busy connecting 52 of his 222 thrown (23%). The fight, which was shown live in the US on Showtime, averaged 334,000 viewers. A replay was shown later in the evening, which averaged 309,000 viewers.

Joshua vs. Parker

It was reported that Joseph Parker's team were looking at Lucas Browne as a potential match-up if they failed to land a unification fight with Joshua. According to Higgins, a date in March 2018 was being discussed with Joshua's team, however Eddie Hearn offered an 80–20 split, which would favour Joshua. Higgins spoke to Fairfax Media, saying the offer would need to be more reasonable, also taking into consideration the fight would take place in the UK. Other names discussed for a Summer 2018 fight included Bryant Jennings and Alexander Povetkin. According to a Tweet from Parker on 15 November, he was offered less than half of what was paid to Charles Martin when he defended his IBF title against Joshua. The next day, Higgins told Fairfax Media that he and Hearn were still negotiating a deal that would benefit all parties. Parker stated he was willing to drop to 35% of the net profit. Higgins made a final offer to Hearn on 22 November. He told Sky Sports, "It's our final bottom line decision. We feel anything less is disrespectful or a disgrace." On 29 November, Hearn stated the fight could be confirmed within two weeks. Higgins listed Camp Nou as the potential venue. According to Hearn on 11 December, a deal was very close to being announced with the Principality Stadium a frontrunner to host the fight. Hearn jokingly said they were over-paying Parker, with the deal being 65–35. On 28 December, Higgins announced that a split had been agreed which would see Parker earn between 30 and 35% of the purse and the fight should take place in April 2018. Higgins stated that a rematch clause would be in place for Joshua, should he lose. In a potential rematch, Parker would get a 55% split. On 8 January 2018, the Principality Stadium in Cardiff was confirmed as the venue for the fight. On 14 January, negotiations came to a close and the fight was officially announced to take place on 31 March in Cardiff, live on Sky Sports Box Office. In an official press release on 5 February, Showtime announced they would televise the fight live in the US. On 16 February, it was noted that Joshua was weighed around 247 pounds, nearly 10 pounds lighter than he weighed against Takam. A picture was posted on Twitter which revealed the scales that Joshua stood on, his weight was at 112.9 kilograms. Joshua and Parker both came in lighter compared to their respective previous bouts. Parker weighed in first at 236.7 pounds, his lightest since he fought Solomon Haumono in 2016. Joshua weighed 242.2 pounds, his lightest since 2014 when he fought Michael Sprott. It was reported that Joshua would earn a career-high £18 million and Parker would also earn a career-high pay of £8 million.

Joshua was forced to go the distance for the first time in his 20–0 career, to defeat Parker, via twelve-round unanimous decision (UD) to claim Parker's WBO heavyweight title, as well as retain his WBA (Super), IBF and IBO titles. The judges scored the fight 118–110 twice, and 119–109 in favour of Joshua. Many media outlets including ESPN had the fight around 116–112 with Joshua the clear winner. With going the distance, Joshua's 20 fight knockout streak came to an end. Parker used his movement well to slip a lot of Joshua's attacks but in doing so did not do enough himself to win more rounds. Parker started on the backfoot in the opening rounds allowing Joshua to gain a foothold. There was an accidental clash of heads in round three, however neither boxer was cut from this. There was another accidental head-butt in round nine where the referee called for a short break. Joshua's tape on his left glove kept coming loose and he was ordered to go back to his corner for a re-tape. Parker suffered a cut over his left eye after Joshua accidentally elbowed him. In round twelve, neither boxer engaged as much as expected with Joshua trying to track Parker down, who again, on the back-foot, looked to survive the round. The fight was marred by Italian referee Giuseppe Quartarone, who kept both boxers from fighting on the inside. This mostly had a negative impact on Parker, where he was seen to have the most success. The referee was breaking the action each time both boxers were on the inside, even when they were still throwing shots. Many boxers, pundits and both the Sky Sports and Showtime broadcast teams criticised the referee during and after the fight.

After the fight, Joshua explained his game plan for the fight, "My strategy in there was kind of stick behind the jab. It's one of the most important weapons. The old saying is the right hand could take you around the block, but a good jab will take you around the world. And that secured another championship belt. So I stuck behind the jab and I made sure anything that was coming back, I was switched on, I was focused and 12 rounds, baby! I thought it was hard, right?" Parker was humble in defeat and stated he would be back even stronger, "Today I got beaten by a better champion, bigger man. A lot to work on. It was a good experience being here. Thank you all for the opportunity to fight in this big stadium. We're gonna go back, train hard, plan again and come back stronger. No regrets, you know, take it on the chin. … So we'll be back again." When asked what he would do different, Parker replied, "Work harder. Come back stronger, more punches. But I would love to have another go. Just back to the drawing board." During the post fight press conference, Parker's team stated the referee did not speak English, whereas Joshua and his promoter Hearn disagreed and said he spoke English fluently. CompuBox punch stats showed that Joshua landed 139 of 383 punches thrown (36.3%) and Parker landed 101 of his 492 thrown (20.5%).

The fight was shown live in the US on Showtime in the afternoon. The live showing averaged 346,000 viewers and peaked at 379,000 viewers. A replay was shown later in the evening which saw an increase. The replay averaged 430,000 viewers and peaked at 483,000 viewers. Nielsen Media Research, who released the figures do not have the facility to measure whether the same customers that watched the live showing tuned in for the replay.

Joshua vs. Povetkin 

From April up until the end of June 2018, both camps of Joshua and Wilder were in talks around the super fight between the two to finally take place. The main hurdles were the purse split, date and venue. At one point Wilder had agreed to fight Joshua in the UK, however there was slight confusions in the contracts that were being sent back and forth. At the same time, Hearn was also working out a deal for Joshua to fight WBA mandatory challenger Alexander Povetkin (34–1, 24 KOs). The WBA initially ordered the fight after Povetkin knocked out David Price on the Joshua-Parker undercard. Negotiations took a turn on 26 June when the WBA gave Joshua's camp 24 hours to finalise a deal with Povetkin. With Joshua closer to fighting Povetkin in September 2018, Hearn stated the Joshua-Wilder fight would still take place in April 2019 at Wembley Stadium. Hearn later explained that the WBA would have granted an exemption, had Wilder signed a deal to fight Joshua.

On 5 July, Hearn announced that Wembley Stadium in London would host Joshua's next two fights on 22 September 2018 and again on 13 April 2019. On 16 July, Joshua vs. Povetkin for the WBA (Super), IBF, WBO, and IBO heavyweight titles was officially announced for 22 September on Sky Box Office. Many British pundits and trainers spoke of how Joshua should not underestimate Povetkin and how he would pose a big threat to Joshua. On 27 July, Joshua signed a new three-year deal with Matchroom Boxing, which would see him showcased on Sky Box Office for at least another five fights, including the bout with Povetkin. On 1 August, it was revealed by the WBO that the bout against Povetkin would satisfy Joshua's mandatory defences for both the WBA and WBO, since Povetkin was ranked as number 1 by both governing bodies. It was also announced that Joshua would be named the WBO's Super Champion should he defeat Povetkin.

In front of nearly 80,000 in attendance, Joshua overcame an initial struggle, eventually knocking out Povetkin in round seven to retain his world titles. Using his movement and coming in and out, Povetkin had Joshua hurt early on with his big shots. In round two, Joshua's nose began to bruise. From round five, Povetkin began to tire. Joshua dropped Povetkin with a left hand to the head in round seven. Povetkin got back up but Joshua was straight back in with a flurry of hard shots, prompting the referee to stop the fight. At the time of stoppage, the three judges scorecards were 58–56 twice, and 59–55 in favour of Joshua.

In the post-fight interview, Joshua stated, "I've got my knockout streak back and I found my right hand again. Alexander Povetkin is a very tough challenge. He provided that, he was good with left hook. I realized he was strong to the head but weak to the body so I was switching it up. Every jab takes a breath out of you and I slowed him down." He then stated he would post a poll on Twitter asking the fans who they would like to see him fight next. CompuBox stats showed that Joshua landed 90 of 256 punches thrown (35%), with 53 of them landed being jabs. Povetkin landed 47 of his 181 thrown (26%). Povekin connected with 43 power shots compared to Joshua 37 landed. There was also a huge size advantage in favour of Joshua, who weighed 246 pounds to Povetkin's 222 pounds. It was reported that Joshua would earn around £20 million and Povetkin would earn around £6 million for the fight.

Joshua vs. Ruiz Jr. 

On 29 December 2018, with Joshua's Wembley date still on hold, Hearn stated that Dillian Whyte was the frontrunner to challenge Joshua. Whilst still waiting for Hearn to contact him, Whyte claimed to hear rumours that Joshua would drop the Wembley date and instead fight American contender Jarrell Miller at Madison Square Garden. On 12 January 2019, Whyte revealed that he had turned down a 'severe lowball' offer from Joshua to fight him in a rematch. Whyte did not reveal the figure, however claimed it was lower than what he received against Chisora in December 2018. By 21 January, Hearn stated there could be a possibility Joshua may well fight in the US instead. According to Hearn, it was Joshua who was making the offer for the Whyte fight. Whyte claimed Joshua did not want to fight him, as he had known since September 2018, that he would be fighting in April 2019, yet did not make any offers. On 1 February, Hearn admitted it was becoming highly unlikely that Joshua would still fight at Wembley Stadium on 13 April. On 2 February, Whyte claimed the Joshua fight 'was dead' and he was to look at other options, including a potential fight with Dominic Breazeale. According to Miller, Joshua initially offered Whyte $3 million, then increased the offer to $5 million, only to go down to $3.5 million.

On 8 February, terms were agreed for Joshua to defend his unified heavyweight titles against Jarrell Miller (23–0–1, 20 KOs) on 1 June at Madison Square Garden in New York City, marking Joshua's US debut. The event became the highest grossing pre-sale in the arena's boxing history. The launch presser began to heat up right from the start after Miller shoved Joshua during their first face off. It eventually settled down and both parties took to their seats. From there on, it was a back and forth verbal exchange, before Miller stormed off the stage. Joshua stayed and answered any remaining questions from the media. It was reported that Joshua would pocket £19.3 million (equivalent to $25 million) for his US debut. Another report claimed Joshua was to earn an estimated $32 million. Miller's deal with DAZN ensured he received a career-high purse of $4.875 million, which would include two more bouts on DAZN worth $3 million.

On 17 April 2019, both camps confirmed the Voluntary Anti-Doping Association had informed them that Miller had tested positive for the banned substance GW1516. The test results were from a random VADA-conducted urine test Miller submitted to on 20 March. Further tests taken on 31 March proved positive for EPO, HGH and GW1516 again. Many boxers, including Ivan Dychko and Manuel Charr put their names forward to fight Joshua instead. Hearn reportedly spoke to 16 heavyweights in the space of 24 hours. Luis Ortiz was the first name that Joshua wanted as a replacement. Hearn was adamant that Joshua would still fight on that date as 17,000 tickets had already been sold, with 10,000 of those being from Britain.

Prior to his fight with Alexander Dimitrenko, on 20 April, former world title challenger Andy Ruiz Jr. (31–1, 20 KOs) put his name forward to replace Miller and challenge Joshua for the unified heavyweight titles on 1 June 2019. On 22 April, Ruiz confirmed his team had a meeting scheduled with promoter Eddie Hearn, officially putting himself in the running. Ruiz became a frontrunner after it was reported Luis Ortiz' team had rejected two offers of career high purses to fight Joshua. Terms were agreed within a week. On 1 May, with one month to go before fight night, Joshua vs. Ruiz was confirmed and announced to take place at Madison Square Garden in New York City exclusively on DAZN in the US. It was reported that Ruiz would earn around $7 million (£5.36m) for the bout.
Joshua dropped Ruiz in the third round, for the first time in the challenger's career. Ruiz beat the count, and scored his own knock down moments later. Joshua was down again towards the end of the round in a massive turn around. Joshua managed to survive the next few rounds, but after a further two knock-downs in the seventh round, the referee waved the fight off, therefore giving Ruiz the win by TKO in the seventh round, gaining all of Joshua's four heavyweight titles. At the time of stoppage, Ruiz was leading the fight 57–56 on two scorecards and Joshua was leading 57–56 on the other. It is considered to be one of the biggest upsets in the history of boxing, rivalling Mike Tyson vs. Buster Douglas.

Second reign as unified heavyweight champion

Joshua vs. Ruiz Jr. II 

A rematch took place on 7 December 2019 at the purpose built Diriyah Arena in Diriyah, Saudi Arabia. At the weigh-in, Joshua came in at 237 pounds (107 kg), nearly ten pounds (4.5 kg) lighter than in the pair's first match. By contrast, Ruiz weighed in at 284 pounds (129 kg), 16 pounds (7.5 kg) heavier than before. On the night, Joshua boxed a disciplined fight, keeping Ruiz at a distance with his jab and using lateral movement to avoid trading punches up close as he had in their first encounter. He started off well, landing a sharp right hand in the first round that cut Ruiz to the side of his left eye. Joshua continued to box economically and land the more meaningful punches. Ruiz had some success when he tagged Joshua to the head and body at the end of the fourth round, but Joshua remained firmly in control of the action. He won via unanimous decision to reclaim the unified heavyweight titles with scores of 118–110 on two judges' scorecards and 119–109 on the other's. In his post-fight interview, a jubilant Joshua declared, "Man, the first time was so nice, I had to do it twice... Stay hungry, stay humble. I'm humble in defeat and will stay humble in victory." Ruiz showed his opponent respect, saying "Anthony Joshua did a hell of a job."

Joshua vs. Pulev 

Joshua had been initially announced to fight Kubrat Pulev in 2017, but a late injury to Pulev saw Carlos Takam replace him for the fight. On 2 March 2020 it was announced that Joshua would defend his heavyweight titles against Pulev (28-1, 14 KOs), who was IBF mandatory challenger, at London's Tottenham Hotspur Stadium on 20 June. However, due to the COVID-19 pandemic, the fight was postponed indefinitely on 3 April 2020. The fight was re-announced with a new date of 12 December and a new venue of The O2 Arena in London. The fight was later moved again to Wembley Arena, and it was announced that up to 1,000 fans would be able to attend due to the recent relaxation of coronavirus restrictions.  On the night, Joshua dropped his opponent twice in the third round, and ultimately defeated Pulev by ninth-round knockout to retain his unified heavyweight titles. Former five-division champion Floyd Mayweather Jr. had been in attendance; Joshua paid tribute to him after the fight, saying "It was an honour to have him in the house. I respect him highly for what he has achieved. He came to see me perform and I pulled off one of his favourite moves - the pull-counter." Mayweather reciprocated the praise, saying "I'm proud of Joshua. He is one of the best heavyweights out there. He won [an Olympic] gold medal, his career is going great, a two-time heavyweight champion. He is a hell of a fighter. He is a gentleman and I enjoy his craft."

Joshua vs. Usyk 

Immediately after defeating IBF mandatory challenger Kubrat Pulev on 12 December 2020 in London, Joshua was asked in the post-fight interview about the prospect of an undisputed fight with undefeated WBC and The Ring champion Tyson Fury, to which Joshua responded, "Whoever's got the belt, I'd love to compete with him. If that is Tyson Fury, let it be Tyson Fury." A two-fight deal between the two champions had been agreed "in principle" since June 2020. On 17 May 2021, Fury announced on his social media that the fight between him and Joshua would take place on 14 August 2021 in Saudi Arabia. However, within 24 hours of the announcement, arbitration judge Daniel Weinstein ruled that former WBC champion Deontay Wilder was entitled to exercise his option for a third fight with Fury on a date up to 15 September; this put the proposed bout between Joshua and Fury in jeopardy, as Wilder indicated that he was not prepared to stand aside to allow the British boxers to proceed. As a result of these developments, on 21 May the WBO gave Joshua's camp 48 hours to come to an agreement for the fight with Fury, or they would instead order a bout against their mandatory challenger, former undisputed cruiserweight champion Oleksandr Usyk. Joshua and Fury's camps could not reach an agreement, and thus on 22 May the WBO issued the instruction that Joshua would have to fight Usyk, with an agreement for the bout to be in place by 31 May. On 20 July, an official announcement was made, confirming that the fight between Joshua and Usyk would be taking place on 25 September at Tottenham Hotspur Stadium. On the night, Usyk produced an upset, outboxing the champion Joshua over 12 rounds to claim a unanimous decision victory, with scores of 117–112, 116–112 and 115–113, handing Joshua the second professional loss of his career. Usyk's movement and variety in his fighting proved to be too much for Joshua, as Usyk nearly stopped the champion in the final seconds of the last round.

Post-title career

Joshua vs. Usyk II 

On 29 September 2021, four days after Oleksandr Usyk defeated Joshua to become unified world heavyweight champion, it was announced by his promoter Alexander Krassyuk that a one-sided rematch clause which had been specified in the fight contract had "already been activated in principle, from the side of Joshua." Krassyuk noted that Usyk relished the prospect of squaring off against Joshua twice: "So I remember when we discussed with Oleksandr the issue of rematch, he was delighted and said 'Wow, cool, I will beat Antokha [sic] twice.'" Regarding the venue of the rematch, Usyk made it known that he hoped it would take place in his native country of Ukraine, saying, "I would love to have the rematch at Olimpiyskiy Stadium in Kyiv." However, Joshua's promoter, Eddie Hearn, stated that Ukraine was a "very unlikely" venue, as he wanted to maximise income: "I think it will be international or the UK, I would think it would be in the UK." On 19 June 2022, it was officially announced that Usyk would be facing Joshua in a rematch in Jeddah, Saudi Arabia on 20 August. The fight would mark the first defence of Usyk's world heavyweight titles, while it was Joshua's twelfth consecutive world heavyweight title fight as he attempted to become a three-time world heavyweight champion.

Despite Joshua's improved performance compared to his first loss to Usyk, the latter successfully defended his belts by a split decision with one judge scoring the fight 115–113 to Joshua, while the other two judges scoring it 115–113 and 116–112 in Usyk's favour. According to New York Times statistics, Joshua landed 37 body punches compared to 15 in their first fight. Overall, however, Usyk outperformed Joshua, landing 170 of 712 punches, compared with 124 of 492 for Joshua. According to CompuBox, Usyk established new records for punches landed by an Anthony Joshua opponent (170) and most punches landed on Joshua in a single round (39 punches in the 10th round). After the announcement of the judges' scorecards, Joshua threw two of Usyk's belts out of the ring and started to walk out of the arena, but came back and once in control of the microphone gave an emotional speech, talking about his life, fighting, Ukraine, and praising Usyk. Shortly after, Joshua was recorded backstage responding to a bystander who had criticised him, yelling: "Who are you talking to? Who are you talking to? Shut your fucking mouth.” In the post-fight press conference, Joshua broke down in tears.

Joshua vs. Franklin 
On 6 February 2023, it was officially announced that Joshua would be returning to the ring on 1 April at The O2 Arena against Jermaine Franklin. The fight would mark the first fight as part of his exclusive five-year deal with sports streaming service DAZN. In the first pre-fight press conference on 9 February, Joshua announced his new partnership with American trainer Derrick James, as well as being questioned by his promoter Eddie Hearn on his motivation for fighting. Joshua answered by repeatedly stating, "Money, money, money", before Hearn had finished asking the question, before further elaborating: “I like making money. Straight up. Like, this is a prizefighting sport."

Public image 
Joshua is recognised as one of the most marketable athletes in the world, and has lucrative endorsement deals with numerous brands, including Under Armour, Beats By Dre, and Lucozade. In 2017, he was ranked as the world's most marketable athlete, ahead of basketball player Stephen Curry, who was ranked most marketable the previous year. Along with his boxing ability, this has been attributed to his "rags to riches" story, enforcing a narrative that he avoided a life of violence and crime by dedicating himself to boxing. Joshua has spoken of his ambition to surpass Floyd Mayweather Jr.'s reported career earnings of $700 million, saying in an interview with GQ, "When I first started, the aim was to become a multi-millionaire. But now there are ordinary people, grandmas and grandads, who are worth millions just because of property prices. So the new school of thought is that I need to be a billionaire. Being a millionaire is good but you have to set your sights higher."

Joshua has also been recognised with his inclusion in the annual Powerlist as one of the 100 most influential Black Britons, most recently in the 2021 edition. He has a tattoo of the continent of Africa on his right shoulder, with the territory of Nigeria outlined, and says he feels a strong connection to his Nigerian roots.

In August 2022, Joshua faced questions around the controversy of his world-title challenge taking place in Saudi Arabia. He was also questioned about the human rights situation in the Kingdom, after the Arab authorities sentenced a 34-year-old woman for 34 years in prison over her Twitter activity. However, he said that people were “loving the positive side of things” and they “don’t focus on anything that’s negative”. Yasser al-Khayat, whose brother Mustafa was executed by Saudi authorities, also wrote a letter to Joshua and urged him to stand up for the human rights. He wrote to Joshua that speaking out could make a real difference, as Saudi uses the events like boxing “to distract from its oppression”.

Racism controversies
Joshua was previously criticised for a set of incidents in November 2017. He called heavyweight boxer Eddie Chambers a "disgrace to the superior black race" on Instagram. Joshua's promoter Eddie Hearn said the message came from a fake account, but the false claim was debunked when Chambers proved that it had indeed been sent from Joshua's verified account.

Joshua later appeared to voice support for Zimbabwean dictator Robert Mugabe on Snapchat. Hearn subsequently stated Joshua has "got a major problem with his social media accounts" and suggested the accounts may have been hacked.

In June 2020, Joshua was accused of racism for his speech at a Black Lives Matter protest in Watford, where he said "show them where it hurts, abstain from spending your money in their shops and economies, and invest in black-owned businesses." This was interpreted by some as a call to boycott white businesses. In response, he said the speech was not his own and that he had only read it out on behalf of a friend. He also said, "If you think I'm a racist, go f*** yourself."

Personal life 
Joshua has expressed an interest in chess as well as reading as a way to reinforce his boxing and tactical abilities. He was a bricklayer before taking up boxing full-time.

In 2009, Joshua was put on remand in Reading Prison for what he describes as "fighting and other crazy stuff." He was made to wear an electronic tag on his ankle when released.

In March 2011, Joshua was pulled over by the police for speeding in Colindale, North London. He was found with eight ounces (226.8 grams) of herbal cannabis hidden in a sports bag in his Mercedes-Benz. He was charged with possession with intent to supply a class B drug, an offence that carries a maximum 14-year sentence. Joshua was suspended from the GB Boxing squad and was sentenced to a 12-month community order and 100 hours' unpaid work after pleading guilty at crown court.

Joshua previously stated in 2012 that he does not support a football team, but when asked in an interview in 2017, he said that although he supports his local team Watford F.C., his "overall favourite" team was Real Madrid C.F. because of Cristiano Ronaldo, as Ronaldo was a Real Madrid player at the time. In the same interview, he also described English footballer Troy Deeney, who he met by chance at a local barbershop in his hometown Watford, as his "good friend".

In an interview with iFL TV in July 2014, Joshua named Muhammad Ali, Mike Tyson, Larry Holmes, Lennox Lewis, and Evander Holyfield as his top five greatest heavyweight boxers of all-time.

Joshua fathered a son named Joseph "JJ" Joshua, with dance teacher Nicole Osbourne, in 2015.

In 2020, Joshua spoke about his positive relationship with his longtime promoter Eddie Hearn, who has promoted him since his professional debut in 2013, saying that he "and Eddie will always have a great friendship."

Professional boxing record

Television viewership

Pay-per-view bouts

International

See also

 List of world heavyweight boxing champions
 List of WBA world champions
 List of IBF world champions
 List of WBO world champions
 List of IBO world champions
 List of British heavyweight boxing champions
 List of Commonwealth Boxing Council champions
 List of Olympic medalists in boxing
 Boxing at the 2012 Summer Olympics

References

External links

English male boxers
Super-heavyweight boxers
1989 births
Living people
Boxers at the 2012 Summer Olympics
Olympic boxers of Great Britain
English Olympic medallists
Olympic gold medallists for Great Britain
Black British sportsmen
Boxers from Greater London
Sportspeople from Watford
Yoruba sportspeople
Olympic medalists in boxing
English people of Irish descent
English people of Nigerian descent
English people of Yoruba descent
Members of the Order of the British Empire
Medalists at the 2012 Summer Olympics
AIBA World Boxing Championships medalists
International Boxing Federation champions
World heavyweight boxing champions
Commonwealth Boxing Council champions
England Boxing champions
World Boxing Association champions
International Boxing Organization champions
British Boxing Board of Control champions
World Boxing Organization champions
Mayflower School alumni